The discography of Alex Karbouris, an Australian DJ/Producer, consists of 16 compilation albums, 96 singles and a number of other remix & production appearances.

Albums

Compilation Albums

Singles

1998
 Alex K - Pussywhipped			
 Alex K - U Got It					
 Alex K - Passion				
 Alex K - Kick it

1999
 Alex K - Shake it up				
 Alex K & Jorjie Jay - Rock my world	
 Alex K - Pump it up 				
 Alex K - Cream of sum young guy	
 Alex K & Supafly - Got to be love

2000
 Alex K - Weppa					
 Alex K - Don't u want my love		
 Alex K - Go!					
 Alex K & Amen UK - I cant wait		
 Alex K & Amen UK - Angel in my heart
 Alex K & Amen UK - Garden of eden
 Alex K feat Pamela - Kickin in the beat
 Alex K feat Pamela - Cmon
 Alex K - Rub a dub dub

2001
 Alex K - Phatt Attack				
 Alex K - Go!					
 Alex K - Ill be there				
 Alex K - On the floor 2001			
 Alex K - Let the fiddler play

2002
 Alex K - Tha Beat Pounds			
 Alex K & Dee - One Summer		
 Alex K - Tell me					
 Alex K - Instant Momentum		
 Europa - Follow the sun
 Klubkillaz - One for ya

2003
 Alex K - Here comes the bass 		
 Europa - Fear no evil			
 Club Enforcer - Tutti Frutti
 Club Enforcer - Throw your hands
 Club Enforcer - Beat of the year
 Club Enforcer - Rock tha house
 Plus 8 - Rippin it up
 DJ S - Djs gonna rock tha house
 Alex K vs Ehab Tawfiq - Allah Aliek Ya Sidi

2004
 Alex K - The raid				
 Alex K feat Cover Girls - Attitude	
 Plus 8 - Go DJ					
 Alex K - Pussywhipped 2004		
 Alex K & Wilz - Dab Ke			
 Alex K feat Mia - Right here waiting 	
 Alex K feat Mia - My angel
 Alex K - Pussy pussy	

2005
 Alex K feat Ellewood - Small town boy 	
 Club Enforcer - Here to chill
 Bandito - Rock rite

2006
 AK Project - Forever
 Amen vs Alex K - Happiness
 AK Project - Come with me
 Sublime - The Rain
 Alex K - Piece of heaven
 Bounce Mafia - Shake that ass
 Porn kings v Klubbed DJs - Amour (Are you ready)
 DJ Sasher - This is no game
 Klubsound - Touch me
 Alex K & Re-Con - Stab Em
 Doje Vamo - 38000 ft
 Klubbed - Firefly
 Klubbers Guide - Pop to this
 Alex K - Faith

2007
 Breeze & Lost Witness - Rise Again
 Alex K v Kuta - Let there be passion
 Alex K - Long way from home
 Superstar DJs - Meet her at the love parade
 Alex K - DJ
 Alex K - My time

2008
 Bassfreakerz - Now your gone
 Club Enforcer - Get up everybody
 Club Enforcer - Royal Flush
 Beat Trippa - Insomnia
 Dinky Allstars - Faith
 Bassfreakerz - Cry for you

2009
 Alex K - If you were mine
 Alex K & Don da da v Pacjam - Lover that you are
 Bad boy - Forever
 Alex K - When the rain begins to fall
 X Rated - On the floor
 Alex K - Another chance
 Alex K - If i don't have you
 Bassfreazerz - Zombie Nation
 Klubbed Djs - Love come down
 XNRG ft Alex K - Riverside
 Alex K ft Taline - Can you feel it

2010
 Alex K - Running
 Phonikal - Sunshine
 Alex K & Wilz - Lost connection (Yo Dj!)
 Alex K & Wilz - Run to me
 Alex K - Raining down
 Alex K - Hooked

2011
 Alex K - Fly
 Alex K - The Calling
 Alex K - Beachball

Music videos
 "If you were mine"
 "Angel in my heart"

References

Discographies of Australian artists